The 2020–21 West Coast Conference men's basketball season began with practices in September 2020 and ended with the 2021 West Coast Conference men's basketball tournament in March 2021. This was the 70th season for WCC men's basketball, and the 32nd under its current name of "West Coast Conference". The conference was founded in 1952 as the California Basketball Association, became the West Coast Athletic Conference in 1956, and dropped the word "Athletic" in 1989.

Head coaches

Coaching changes 
On March 8, 2020, it was announced that Mike Dunlap would end his tenure as head coach at Loyola Marymount. He spent six seasons as their head coach and posted a record of 81–108. During the 2018–19 season, LMU began the season with eight straight wins and reached the semifinals of the College Basketball Invitational. However, in the 2019–20 season their record was 11-21 and they only reached the second round of the WCC tournament. Soon thereafter, on March 20, Loyola Marymount announced that Stan Johnson, the associate head coach at Marquette, would become their new head coach. Johnson played college basketball at Southern Utah University and has coached at various universities in the West and Midwest. On February 5, 2021, the University of Portland announced that Terry Porter had been released as head coach and Ben Johnson had been named as interim head coach until the end of the season.

Coaches 

Notes:

 Year at school includes 2020–21 season.
 Overall and WCC records are from time at current school and are through the beginning of the 2020–21 season.

Preseason

Preseason poll

All-WCC Preseason Men's Basketball team

Rankings

Regular season

Conference matrix

Early season tournaments 
The following table summarizes the multiple-team events (MTE) or early season tournaments in which teams from the West Coast Conference participated.

WCC Player/Freshman of the Week 
Throughout the year, the West Coast Conference named a player of the week and a freshman of the week as follows:

National Awards and Teams

All-Americans 

The following WCC players were named as national All-Americans as follows:

AP Honorable Mention:

 Joël Ayayi, Gonzaga

 Alex Barcello, BYU

Other National Awards 
The following WCC players were named to national award watch lists and received awards as follows:

Wooden Award - Player of the Year

Naismith Award - Player of the Year

Bob Cousy Award - Point Guard

Jerry West Award - Shooting Guard

Julius Erving Award - Small Forward

Karl Malone Award - Power Forward

Kareem Abdul-Jabbar Award - Center

All-WCC Awards and Teams 
On March 2, 2021, the West Coast Conference announced the following awards:

Postseason

West Coast Conference tournament 
Gonzaga defeated BYU 88–78 in the Championship game to win the tournament on March 9. Mark Few was the winning coach and Jalen Suggs was named the MVP of the tournament.

NCAA tournament 
BYU and Gonzaga participated in the 2021 NCAA Tournament. Gonzaga earned an automatic bid to the tournament by winning the WCC tournament and was awarded the number one overall seed. BYU was awarded an at-large selection as the 23rd overall seed and the 6-seed in the East Regional. BYU was defeated in the first round by UCLA 72–63 while Gonzaga advanced to the National Championship game eventually losing to the overall champions Baylor 86–70.

National Invitation Tournament (NIT) 
Saint Mary's was selected as a 2-seed in a field of 16 teams to participate in the NIT Tournament. Saint Mary's was eliminated in the first round by 3-seed Western Kentucky 69–67.

College Basketball Invitational (CBI) tournament 
Pepperdine was selected as part of the field of 8 teams to participate in the CBI Tournament. Pepperdine won the tournament by defeating Coastal Carolina 84–61 in the Championship game on March 24.

References 

West Coast Conference men's basketball
NCAA Division I